Madeleine or Madeline is a feminine given name, ultimately of Greek origin. The name exists in various spellings and pronunciations and is popular among those living in Europe and English-speakers, as well as followers of Christianity, as Mary Magdalene was a central figure in the New Testament.

Madeleine is a modern rendering, found in English and French, of the Greek epithet Μαγδαληνὴ (Magdalene, "from Magdala"). It arose as a name due to its association with the Biblical character and female disciple Mary Magdalene. It has a secondary meaning from German of "little girl" (Mädelein).

Pronunciation depends on the language and the country. In France, the name is pronounced /ma.dlɛn/ and the two most popular pronunciations in English are /ˈmædələn/ (American English) and /ˈmadlɪn/ (British English).

Madelyn/Madalyn is an alternative spelling. Diminutives include Maddy/Maddie, Maddi and Leine.

People named Madeleine
Madeleine of Valois (1520–1537), French Princess who was briefly Queen consort of Scotland through her marriage to James V of Scotland
Madeleine Albright (1937–2022), American politician and the first woman to become the United States Secretary of State
Madeleine Astor (1893–1940), second wife and widow of millionaire John Jacob Astor IV and a survivor of the RMS Titanic disaster
Madeleine Béjart (1618–1672), French actor and theatre director
Madeleine Brès (1842–1921), the first French woman to obtain a medical degree
Madeleine Carroll (1906–1987), English actress
Madeleine Damerment (1917–1944), French Resistance member
Madeleine Dean (born 1959), American politician
Madeleine Herman de Blic, Belgian-born Indian social worker and humanist
Madeleine de Roybon d'Allonne (1646–1718), early settler of New France
Madeleine Eastoe, Australian ballet dancer
Madeleine Juneau (1945-2020), Canadian museologist, teacher, nun
Madeline Kripke (1943–2020), American book collector
Madeleine Kunin (born 1933), American politician and the first woman to become the Governor of Vermont
Madeleine Lartessuti (1478–1543), French shipper and banker
Madeleine L'Engle (1918–2007), American writer; author of the Wrinkle in Time series
Madeleine Mantock (born 1990), British actress 
Madeleine McCann (born 2003), British girl who disappeared while on vacation in Portugal in May 2007
Madeleine Mitchell, British violinist 
Madeleine Peyroux (born 1973), American jazz singer, songwriter, and guitarist
Madeleine de Puisieux (1720–1798), French philosopher and feminist writer
Madeleine Rolland (1872-1960), French translator and peace activist
Madeleine Smith (1835–1928), Scottish socialite tried for murder
Madeleine Stowe (born 1958), American actress
Madeleine Vionnet (1876–1975), French fashion designer who was the first to cut dresses on the bias
Madeleine Worrall (born 1977), Scottish actress
Princess Madeleine, Duchess of Hälsingland and Gästrikland (born 1982), seventh in line to the Swedish throne

People named Madeline
Madeline Bell (born 1942), American soul singer
Madeline McDowell Breckenridge (1872–1920), American women's suffragette leader and reformer
Madeline Brewer (born 1992), American actress
Madeline Carroll (born 1996), American actress
Madeline McWhinney Dale (1922–2020), American economist and banker
Madeline Duggan (born 1994), English actress 
Madeline Fairbanks (1900–1989), American actress 
Madeline Ivalu, Canadian filmmaker and actress
Madeline Juno (born 1995), German singer-songwriter
Madeline Kahn (1942–1999), American actress, comedian and singer
Madeline Lewellin (1854–1944), Australian artist
Madeline Manning (born 1948), American track and field runner
Madeline Mitchell (born 1989), American beauty pageant contestant 
Madeline Perry (born 1977), professional squash player from Northern Ireland
Madeline Smith (born 1949), English actress and comedian
Madeline Zima (born 1985), American actress

Fictional characters
Madeline, heroine of the book series of the same name by Ludwig Bemelmans
Monsieur Madeleine, an alias used by Jean Valjean in the novel Les Misérables
Madeline Bassett, a recurring character in the Jeeves stories of P. G. Wodehouse
Madeline Bray, the wife of Nicholas Nickleby in the novel of that name by Charles Dickens
Madeleine Cahill, in The 39 Clues novel series
Madeleine Elster, the mysterious central character in Hitchcock's film, Vertigo
Maddie Fitzpatrick (Madeline), in Disney's TV series The Suite Life of Zack & Cody
Madeleine Gotto, from the Canadian children's animated television series Mona the Vampire
Madeleine Gravis, from Charlie Kauffman's film, Synecdoche, New York
Madeleine Hanna, the heroine of Jeffrey Eugenides' 2011 book The Marriage Plot
Madeline Hatter, daughter of the Mad Hatter in the Mattel doll franchise Ever After High
Madeline "Mads" Ryback, in the television show The Lying Game
Dr. Madeleine Swann, love interest in the 2015 James Bond film Spectre
Madeline Wayne, title character of Oh Madeline, an American sitcom that lasted one season (1983–84)
Madeline Usher, the twin sister of Roderick Usher in the short story "The Fall of the House of Usher" by Edgar Allan Poe
Madeline Westen, in the television series Burn Notice
Madeline (Celeste), protagonist of the 2018 video game Celeste

English feminine given names
English-language feminine given names
Feminine given names
French feminine given names